is a Japanese novelist and author, born in Kumagaya. He is best known for the controversial  (悪魔の飽食) (1981), which revealed the atrocities committed by Unit 731 of the Imperial Japanese Army during the Sino-Japanese War (1937–1945).

The Devil's Gluttony was serialized in the Akahata (Japanese Communist Party's newspaper) in 1980, and subsequently published by Kobunsha (光文社), in two volumes in 1981 and 1982. In the ensuing controversy, half of a photograph was discovered to be a fabrication, and Kobunsha subsequently withdrew the book. A second edition was then published by Kadokawa Shoten in 1983 with the controversial photograph removed.

He won the Edogawa Rampo Prize in 1969 for Death in the High-Rise (高層の死角).

His short story "Devil of a Boy" appears translated into English in Ellery Queen's Japanese Golden Dozen: The Detective Story World in Japan anthology, which was edited by Ellery Queen.

References

External links
J'Lit | Authors : Seiichi Morimura | Books from Japan 

Japanese writers
Japanese mystery writers
Mystery Writers of Japan Award winners
Edogawa Rampo Prize winners
1933 births
Living people
Writers from Saitama Prefecture